The hamingja was a type of female guardian spirit in Norse mythology. It was believed that she accompanied a person and decided their luck and happiness. Consequently, the name was also used to indicate happiness, and that is what it means in modern Icelandic. When a person died, the hamingja passed to a beloved family member and thus accompanied a family for several generations, continuing to influence their fortunes. It was even possible to lend one's own hamingja to a friend, as happened when Hjalti Skeggiason was about to leave on a perilous voyage and asked Olaf II of Norway to lend him his hamingja.

It usually appears during sleep in the form of an animal, but it can also be the spirit of a sleeping person who appears in the form of an animal, as Bödvar Bjarki in the saga of Hrólfr Kraki.

In Norse mythology, hamingja (Old Norse "luck") refers to two concepts: 
 the personification of the good fortune or luck of an individual or family, 
 the altered appearance of shape-shifters.

Both Andy Orchard and Rudolf Simek note parallels between the concept of the hamingja and the fylgja. Luck may be transferred to a descendant of the owner, or to a member of a tribe for a perilous journey, it accords wealth, success and power, and it accrues over a life time. Sometimes hamingja is used to denote honor.

See also
Dís
Norns

Notes

References

Orchard, Andy (1997). Dictionary of Norse Myth and Legend. Cassell. 
Simek, Rudolf (2007) translated by Angela Hall. Dictionary of Northern Mythology. D.S. Brewer. 

Creatures in Norse mythology
Scandinavian legendary creatures
Female supernatural figures in Norse mythology
Tutelary deities